Sergei Vorzhev (Russian: Сергей Дмитриевич Воржев;  born 21 February 1950) is a Russian artist based in Krasnodar.

Biography
Sergei Dmitrievich Vorzhev was born on 21 February 1950 in Varenikovskaya cossack village of Krasnodar Region. In 1972 he graduated from the Faculty of Art of Kuban State University.
He is a member of the Russia's Painters union since 1983.

In the subjects of his works he falls back upon the history of Kuban, represents landscapes and wild nature of his smaller motherland, applying very often the ethnic surrealism style. One of his favorite motives is the marapatsutsa ("my solar chariot").

A participant of more than 40 exhibitions of all levels, including 14 international, since 1977. More than 10 personal exhibitions.
His works were bought by the Krasnodar Art museum, Maikop Art museum, Russian Ministry of Culture, some of them are now in private collections in United States, Japan, Singapore, New Zealand, Canada, Germany, Austria, Italy, France, Russia.

Works
 "House of antiquarian" (1980);
 "Sign of the sea" (1986);
 series "Marapatsutsa" (1984–1998);
 series "UFO" (1984–2001);
 series "Flown away bird Kuban" (1987–2000);
 series "Kuban angels" (1996–2000);
 series "Solyony farm-stead" (1990–2001);
 "Year of the rooster" (1994);
 series "Ekaterinodar" (1979–2001);
 series "Coast of Aphrodite" (1996–2000).

Exhibitions
 1977. Republican exhibition of picture and watercolors. Leningrad, Central Exhibition Hall
 1980. Republican exhibition "Soviet Russia". Moscow, Central Exhibition Hall
 1981. All-Union youth exhibition. Tashkent, Central Exhibition Hall
 1984. All-Union exhibition of young artists. Moscow, USSR Academy of Arts
 1986. Republican exhibition "Soviet Russia". Moscow, Central Exhibition Hall
 1987. "Drawings of Kuban". Belgrade, Yugoslavia
 1989. International exhibition "Starway of the Mankind". Moscow, Central Exhibition Hall
 1990. International exhibition "Starway of the mankind". Travelling exhibition in United States cities
 1990. "Modern art of Kuban". Mimara Museum, Zagreb, Croatia
 1991. Personal exhibition, INTERPRESSCENTER, Warsaw, Poland
 1991. International exhibition "To the stars". Moscow, Central House of Artist
 1991–1993 International exhibition "To the stars". Travelling exhibition in United States cities and towns
 1993. Exhibition of Kuban artists "The passing Millennium". Moscow, Central House of Artist
 1994. Exhibition of Russian artists "Multifaced Russia". Moscow, Russian Academy of Arts
 1994. Third International biennale of easel graphics "Kaliningrad-Koenigsberg-94»
 1996. Personal exhibition, Hamburg, Germany
 1996. Personal exhibition, ASTON Trading GmbH, Hamburg, Germany
 1998. Regional exhibition "South of Russia – 98", Krasnodar, Russia
 1998. "Modern arts festival", Sochi, Russia
 1999. Russian exhibition "Russia – 99", Moscow
 1999. Personal exhibition. Italy, Verona, gallery "La Torretta»
 2001. Personal exhibition, Stuttgart, Germany
 2001. Exhibition of Kuban artists "Nu – 2001", Krasnodar
 2001. Biennale 2001, Central Exhibition Hall, Krasnodar
 2002. "Art-Ekaterina 2002", Central Exhibition Hall, Krasnodar
 2002. Personal exhibition of graphics, gallery "South", Krasnodar, Russia
 2003. The exhibition project "Moscow-Krasnodar", Krasnodar, Russia
 2003. Regional exhibition "The South of Russia ", Krasnodar, Russia
 2003. The international biennial "Kuban-Abkhazia", Krasnodar, Russia
 2004. Regional exhibition "The South of Russia ", Krasnodar, Russia
 2005. Exhibition "Art of artists of Kuban ", St.Petersburg, Russia
 2005. The All-Russia art exhibition, devoted to Day of the Victory, Krasnodar, Russia
 2006. Republican art exhibition, the Central House of the Artist, Moscow, Russia
 2007. Regional exhibition "Blessed Kuban ", Krasnodar, Russia
 2007. Exhibition "Art of artists of Kuban ", St.Petersburg, Russia
 2008. Exhibition "Culture of Kuban ", Hanover, Germany
 2008. Exhibition of painting and charts "21", Krasnodar, Russia
 2008. Regional exhibition "The South of Russia ", Krasnodar, Russia
 2008 Personal exhibition, gallery "ART-Union", Krasnodar, Russia
 2009. Ffirstirst International open-air UNESCO "The Earth Gold Amazons", Taman, Russia
 2010. National exhibition "Russia-10", Moscow, Russia
 2010. Personal exhibition, the Russian Olympic house, Vancouver, British Columbia, Canada

Awards
Honored Painter of the Russian Federation since 1997. The member of the board of the Krasnodar Regional painters' union. The Gentleman of an award of Peter Great I degrees.

Gallery

References

External links 
 
 Painter Sergey Vorzhev – Russian Travel Guide – RTG TV

1950 births
Living people
People from Krymsky District
20th-century Russian painters
Russian male painters
21st-century Russian painters
Soviet artists
20th-century Russian male artists
21st-century Russian male artists